Mandau River is a river in Riau province of central Sumatra island, Indonesia, about 1000 km northwest of the capital Jakarta.
It is a tributary of the Siak River.

Geography
The river flows in the central area of Sumatra with predominantly tropical rainforest climate (designated as Af in the Köppen-Geiger climate classification). The annual average temperature in the area is 23 °C. The warmest month is August, when the average temperature is around 24 °C, and the coldest is January, at 22 °C. The average annual rainfall is 2899 mm. The wettest month is November, with an average of 403 mm rainfall, and the driest is June, with 115 mm rainfall.

See also
List of rivers of Indonesia
List of rivers of Sumatra

References

Rivers of Riau
Rivers of Indonesia